Vanasushava is a monotypic genus of flowering plants belonging to the family Apiaceae. Its only species is Vanasushava pedata. Its native range is Southwestern India.

References

Apioideae
Monotypic Apioideae genera